The 1947–48 season was Blackpool F.C.'s 40th season (37th consecutive) in the Football League. They competed in the 22-team Division One, then the top tier of English football, finishing ninth. They also reached the FA Cup Final, in which they lost 4–2 to Manchester United (see 1948 FA Cup Final).

Stan Mortensen was the club's top scorer for the fourth consecutive season, with 31 goals (21 in the league and ten in the FA Cup, including a hat-trick against Tottenham in the semi-finals).

Table

Notes

References

Blackpool F.C.
Blackpool F.C. seasons